Jeong Dong-ho (or  ; born 7 March 1990) is a South Korean footballer. He currently plays for Suwon.

In January 2011, Jeong joined J2 League side Gainare Tottori on loan until 1 January 2012.

In January 2012, Jeong was loaned to Chinese Super League side Hangzhou Greentown until the end of 2012 league season.

Club statistics

References

External links

 Profile at f-marinos.com 

1990 births
Living people
Association football defenders
South Korean footballers
South Korean expatriate footballers
Yokohama F. Marinos players
Gainare Tottori players
Zhejiang Professional F.C. players
Ulsan Hyundai FC players
J1 League players
J2 League players
Chinese Super League players
K League 1 players
Expatriate footballers in Japan
South Korean expatriate sportspeople in Japan
Expatriate footballers in China
South Korean expatriate sportspeople in China
Sportspeople from Busan